Alexandre Pichot (born 6 January 1983) is a French former professional road bicycle racer, who competed professionally between 2006 and 2019, entirely for the  team and its later iterations.

Major results

2003
 1st Stage 2 Tour de Guadeloupe
 1st Stage 3 Circuit des Ardennes
2004
 7th La Roue Tourangelle
 7th La Côte Picarde
2005
 3rd Grand Prix de Waregem
 4th La Côte Picarde
 7th Overall Ruban Granitier Breton
 7th Classic Loire Atlantique
2006
 10th Overall Tour de Picardie
 10th Grand Prix de Rennes
2007
 8th Overall Tour of Qatar
1st  Young rider classification
2008
 5th Paris–Camembert
 6th Overall Tour of Qatar
2009
 3rd Cholet-Pays de Loire
2010
 7th Overall Tour de Picardie
 9th Overall Boucles de la Mayenne
2012
 5th Dwars door Vlaanderen
 8th E3 Harelbeke
 9th Omloop Het Nieuwsblad
2013
 6th Tour de la Somme
 7th Tour du Doubs
2014
 9th Trofeo Muro–Port d'Alcúdia
2017
 10th Overall La Tropicale Amissa Bongo
2018
 10th Le Samyn

Grand Tour general classification results timeline

References

External links 

Profile at Bouygues Télécom official website

French male cyclists
1983 births
Living people
Sportspeople from Caen
Cyclists from Normandy